Live: Madison Square Garden Center (1970) is the 11th comedy album by Bill Cosby.

The entire album was ad-libbed on stage at the Felt Forum at Madison Square Garden. The album features highlights from two shows of February 7, 1970, which Cosby performed in a cast on his right foot due to a recent injury to his ankle. The shows also featured musical performances from Carmen McRae and Lionel Hampton, whose set featured Cosby coming out to play "The Saints" on vibraphone.

Track listing
Bill's Marriage  – 3:40
Bill's First Baby  – 8:30
Bill Takes His Daughters to the Zoo  – 2:50
Ennis and His Two Sisters  – 5:45
The Story of the Chicken  – 2:55
Animal Stories  – 7:00
 Handball at the "Y"  – 4:00
Bill Visits Ray Charles  – 5:00

References

Bill Cosby live albums
Stand-up comedy albums
Spoken word albums by American artists
Live spoken word albums
1970 live albums
Albums recorded at Madison Square Garden
Uni Records live albums
1970s comedy albums